is a Japanese multi-instrumentalist, singer-songwriter, and frontman for the Southern All Stars, as well of his own solo band, the Kuwata band. He has also done a significant amount of scoring music for films. He went to Aoyama Gakuin University.

In 2010, Southern All Stars was ranked No. 1, and Kuwata's solo band, the Kuwata Band, ranked No. 12 on HMV Japan's list of the top 100 musicians in Japan.

Kuwata has worked as a record producer, a movie director, has recorded albums as bandleader of his own band, the Kuwata Band, and has worked on projects scoring music to film.

Biographical information 
Keisuke Kuwata was born February 26, 1956, and raised in Chigasaki, Kanagawa Prefecture, Japan.

Kuwata's wife, Yuko Hara, is also a member of the Southern All Stars. She is a vocalist and plays keyboards. The two met while in college, where they were in the same circle of musicians.　They married in 1982, after the success of the band's single Chako no Kaiganmonogatari, and invited 3000 fans of the band to their wedding reception. They share a love of the blues and have two sons together.

On July 28, 2010, Kuwata announced that he had been diagnosed with esophageal cancer. The operation to remove the cancer was successful and he has made several public appearances since June 2011.

Musical style 

Kuwata plays guitar, bass, drums and keyboards.  For one album, Suteki Na Mirai Wo Mite Hoshii (素敵な未来を見て欲しい), Kuwata played every musical instrument and recorded the entire album himself.

Kuwata's Western musical influences are varied. Along with his wife, the band's keyboardist and backing vocalist, Yuko Hara, the couple have long been inspired by American folk music, where preferences run from Bob Dylan, the Band, Blues, and Southern rock music, to British and American influences that are arguably pure rock and Roll; with a flattering number of songs covered from the work of Eric Clapton.

Aside from Dylan, Kuwata's work has shown emphasis on music of the American South, including that of Creedence Clearwater Revival and Little Feat. Along with the Southern All Stars, Kuwata has performed with Little Feat on several occasions, and recorded cover songs from the band. He was a participant and performer in a tribute concert to the late Lowell George, (Little Feat's original frontman), recording a medley on video that contained his version of "Dixie Chicken".

In 1990, American musician Ray Charles released an English-language version of "Ellie My Love", a song whose music and original Japanese lyrics were written by Kuwata, on Charles's album Would You Believe? The song was already successful in Japan prior to the album's release, having been used in a Japanese television commercial.

In 1991, Kuwata began a series of concerts, similar to MTV Unplugged performances, called the "Acoustic Revolution", featuring Hirokazu Ogura on guitar, and Yoshiyuki Sahashi on mandolin, along with other musicians using acoustic instruments. Here again, Dylan's influence shone through their work choosing standards including "Like a Rolling Stone".

Kuwata also developed a love for rock music. The influence from Eric Clapton is strong and can be heard even when Kuwata performs songs in same manner and style as those that Clapton himself covered, and did not write. In addition, other artists covered have been Jimi Hendrix, Bob Marley, and Sam Cooke.

In 1994, the "On Air Music Fair", "I Shot the Sheriff" by Bob Marley was performed by Kuwata and Ann Lewis.

Philanthropy 

Kuwata has performed with his band, and collaborated with several others annually to donate money towards AIDS research and treatment. To draw the largest possible audiences, Kuwata performs additional Western songs so the concerts are more inclusive. Depending upon the year of the concert, sometimes the chosen songs have a theme.

Kuwata has been joined in benefit concerts by other bands and musicians. The band features a combination of jazz, blues, and rock, along with their own combination of ambient experimental music. Yamagen is considered a "guitar support unit", in the same way Westerners would think of a horn section. Some of these concert songs included:

 1996 Theme: Jazz Cafe
 1997 Theme: Kayou Suspense Theater
 1998 Theme: All Request Show
 1999 Theme: Eric Claptoso
 "Little Wing", by Jimi Hendrix, and "Why Does Love Got to Be So Sad?", recorded by Eric Clapton several decades earlier.
 2000 Theme: Best Songs of The 20th Century Selected By Kuwata
 2001 Theme: Plays The Beatles
 2003 Theme: Disco And Soul Of Glory
 2004 Theme: The Golden Age Of British Rock
 "Time" by Pink Floyd, "Highway Star" by Deep Purple, "We Will Rock You" by Queen.
 2006 Theme: Stars And Stripes Forever!? My American Heros
 "Proud Mary" by Creedence Clearwater Revival
 2008 Theme: Hitori Kohaku Utagassen 1
 2009 Theme: Movie Songs
 2013 Theme: Hitori Kohaku Utagassen 2

Discography

Original albums 
 Keisuke Kuwata (July 9, 1988)
 Kodoku-no Taiyō ("孤独の太陽", The Sun of Solitude) (September 23, 1994)
 Rock and Roll Hero (September 26, 2002)
 Musicman (February 23, 2011)
 Garakuta ("がらくた", Junk) (August 23, 2017）

Compilation albums 
 From Yesterday (June 27, 1992)
 Top Of The Pops (November 27, 2002)
 I LOVE YOU -now & forever- (July 18, 2012)

Albums and DVDs 
 Subete no Uta ni Zange shina – Live Tour '94
 Kuwata Keisuke Act Against AIDS 2008 Shouwa 83 Nendo!Hitori
 Live tour Garakuta (April 4, 2018）

Albums of the Kuwata Band, 1986 
 Nippon No Rock Band (July 14)
 Rock Concert – Live Album (December 5)

Singles of the Kuwata Band, 1986 
 Ban Ban Ban (April 5)
 Skipped Beat ("スキップ・ビート") (July 5)
 Merry Christmas In Summer (July 5)
 One Day (November 5)

Solo singles 
 Kanashii Kimochi (Just a Man in Love) ("悲しい気持ち (JUST A MAN IN LOVE)", "Sad Feelings (Just a Man in Love)") (1987)
 Itsuka Dokoka-de (I Feel the Echo) ("いつか何処かで (I FEEL THE ECHO)", "Somewhere Some Time (I Feel the Echo)")   (1988)
 Mayonaka-no Dandy ("真夜中のダンディー", "Midnight's Dandy") (1993)
 Tsuki ("月", "Moon") (1994)
 Matsuri-no-ato ("祭りのあと", "After the Carnival") (1994)
 Naminori Jonny ("波乗りジョニー", "Surfing Jonny") (2001)
 Shiroi koibitotachi ("白い恋人達", "White Lovers") (2001)
 Tokyo ("東京") (2002)
 Ashita Harerukana ("明日晴れるかな", "Will it Be Sunny Tomorrow?") (2007)
 Kaze no Uta wo Kikasete ("風の詩を聴かせて", "Listen to the Wind's Song") (2007)
 Darling ("ダーリン") (2007)
 Kimi ni Sayonara wo ("君にサヨナラを", "Good-Bye to You") (2009)
 Hontou ha Kowai Ai to Romance ("本当は怖い愛とロマンス", "In Fact, Fearful Love and Romance") (2010)
 Asu heno March / Let's try again -kuwata keisuke ver.- / Hadaka DE Ondo -Matsuri da!! Naked- (2011)
 Yin Yang / Namida wo Buttobase!! / Oishii Himitsu (2013)
 Yoshiko-San ("ヨシ子さん") (2017)
 Kimi heno Tegami ("君への手紙", "A Letter to You") (2017)

With Super Chimpanzee 
  (1991)

With Mr. Children 
 Kiseki-no Hoshi ("奇跡の地球(ほし)", Earth of Miracle) (1995)

With Yuzo Kamon 
 Kuwata Keisuke, Yuzo Kamon & Victor Wheels Live!(嘉門雄三 & Victor Wheels Live! (1982)

Film work, record scoring 
Kuwata directed the movie, Inamura Jane, for which he composed the music. It was released on September 8, 1990, by Toho. Previously, he composed the music for Aiko 16-sai in 1983, which won the Award of the Japanese Academy for Newcomer of the Year, and the Yokohama Film Festival's Festival Prize for 
Yasuko Tomita as Best New Actress. 
He has also written the scores for several Japanese films. Kuwata wrote the theme song, "Ashita Hareru Kana", featured in the popular Japanese television drama series, Operation Love, which won the award for "Best Television Theme Song" at the 53rd Japanese Television Awards, in 2007.

Honors
Medal with Purple Ribbon (2014)

References

External links 
 ASMART – Amuse, Inc. 

1956 births
Living people
Aoyama Gakuin University alumni
Japanese guitarists
Japanese male rock singers
Japanese multi-instrumentalists
Japanese male singer-songwriters
Southern All Stars members
People from Chigasaki, Kanagawa
Slide guitarists
Musicians from Kanagawa Prefecture
Recipients of the Medal with Purple Ribbon
Amuse Inc. talents
20th-century Japanese male singers
20th-century Japanese singers
21st-century Japanese male singers
21st-century Japanese singers